"Deor" (or "The Lament of Deor") is an Old English poem found on folio 100r–100v of the late-10th-century collection the Exeter Book. The poem consists of a reflection on misfortune by a poet whom the poem is usually thought to name Deor. The poem has no title in the Exeter Book itself; the modern title has been bestowed by modern editors.

In the poem, Deor's lord has replaced him with another poet. Deor mentions various figures from Germanic tradition and reconciles his own troubles with the troubles these figures faced, ending each section with the refrain "that passed away, so may this."

The poem comprises forty-two alliterative lines.

Genre
Attempts at placing this poem within a genre have proven to be quite difficult. Some commentators attempting to characterise the work have called it an ubi sunt ("where are they?") poem because of its meditations on transience. It can also be considered a traditional lament and poem of consolation.  Christian consolation poems, however, usually attempt to subsume personal miseries in a historical or explicitly metaphysical context (e.g., Boethius's Consolation of Philosophy), and such perspectives are somewhat remote from the tradition of Anglo-Saxon poetry.  Medievalist scholars who have viewed the poem within the Anglo-Saxon tradition have therefore seen it primarily as a begging poem—a poem written by a travelling and begging poet who is without a place at a noble court—although because few other begging poems survive, assigning it to such a genre is somewhat speculative. Others have related "Deor" to other melancholy poems in the Exeter Book, such as "The Seafarer" and "The Wanderer". Richard North has argued that the poem was written in about 856 as a satire on King Æthelwulf of Wessex.

John Miles Foley has hypothesized that the apparent murkiness of "Deor" is also in no small part attributable to the obscurity of the poet's references. As he puts it, "Cut off from its traditional background, 'Deor' makes little sense".  Because the poem is not entirely translatable into modern English—the third and fourth stanzas remain indeterminate to this day, and even the refrain prompts argument and poses linguistic difficulties—without grasping the allusions of the poem, it is quite difficult to understand the poet's implied attitude, and therefore to place it in any genre satisfactorily.  Further, given the mass loss of Anglo-Saxon literature, it is possible that constraining the poem to an existing genre is artificial, for the poem may represent yet another, otherwise unattested genre, or it might well stand alone outside of generic rules.

Summary

"Deor" is a lament in the voice of a poet exiled from his former life of luxury, respect, and popularity. He compares his current predicament to the predicaments of figures from stories traditional in medieval Germanic-speaking culture.

The first twenty-seven lines of the poem present five vignettes, alluding to traditional stories and separated by a refrain (for which there is no close parallel elsewhere in Old English poetry) which says "" (usually translated "that passed over, so may this"). Although the precise significance of this refrain is debated, it clearly indicates that the misfortunes described in each vignette were eventually overcome. Four of the five vignettes mention characters well known from stories associated with Theodoric the Great, but it is unclear what the other is alluding to. Partly for this reason, many scholars have assumed that there is no narrative thread running through the poem. Recent work has, however, argued that the vignettes imply a narrative sequence connected with Theodoric; in particular, Jennifer Lorden has argued that the vignettes trace the career of Widia as most clearly attested in the Old Norse Þiðreks saga.

The first vignette presents the travails of the legendary smith Weland caused by his enslavement by the king Niðhad.

The second turns to the difficulties experienced by Niðhad's daughter Beadohilde, implicitly when Weland takes revenge on her father by murdering her brothers and getting her pregnant.

The text of the third vignette is ungrammatical and its meaning uncertain. In the 1930s, Kemp Malone influentially proposed that it talks about characters called Geat and Maethild, and that their story is the same as that told in the much later Scandinavian ballad known as the Power of the Harp. Variants of this ballad from all the Scandinavian nations are known, and in some of these variants the names of the protagonists are Gauti and Magnhild. Numerous other interpretations exist, including that the vignette is part of a well integrated narrative sequence and concerns Niðhad.

The fourth vignette presents the thirty-year reign of Theodoric the Great. A possible connection between this and the preceding sections is that the Old English poem Waldere, as well as German and Old Norse analogues, have Widia, the son of Weland and Beaduhild, as one of Theodoric's foremost retainers.

The fifth vignette comments on the miseries inflicted by Ermanaric of the Goths, implicitly following his usurpation of Theodoric's power as recounted in legendary Germanic-language stories. In Lorden's argument, these events too are ones which centrally feature Widia.

The remainder of the poem (lines 28–42) turn to the narrator's own sorrow at having lost his position of privilege. At the poem's conclusion, we learn that this person (who, depending on the interpretation of the Old English, may be called Deor) reveals that he was once a great poet among the Heodenings, until he was displaced and sent wandering by Heorrenda, a more skillful poet. Once more, it is clear that the poem alludes to stories attested more widely in the medieval Germanic-speaking world. According to Norse mythology, the Heodenings (Hjaðningar) were involved in the never-ending "battle of the Heodenings", the Hjaðningavíg. Heorrenda (Hjarrandi) was also one of the names of the god Odin.

Literary influence
Deor had a profound influence on J. R. R. Tolkien, the refrain in particular—which he himself translated as "Time has passed since then, this too can pass"—decline and fall in Middle-earth being, according to Tom Shippey, a central theme of The Lord of the Rings.

See also 
Beowulf
This too shall pass (proverb)
Widsith

References

External links 
 Old English Poetry in Facsimile Project, containing edition, digital images of manuscript pages, and translation
 Old English text with parallel translation
 Deor's Lament, modern English translation with translator's footnotes
 Modern English translation by Aaron K. Hostetter
 Seamus Heaney reciting his translation of the poem
 Deor, translation by Jesse Glass
 Deor, set to music by Will Rowan

Germanic mythology
Old English poems